Ester (Estusia/Esterka) Wajcblum (1924–1945) was a Jewish resistance fighter in the Auschwitz underground and one of four women hanged in the Auschwitz concentration camp for her role in the Sonderkommando revolt of October 7, 1944.

Life

Family 
Ester was born to Jakub and Rebeka (née Jaglom) Wajcblum in Warsaw, Poland. She had an older sister, Sabina, and a younger sister, Hanka Wajcblum (Anna Heilman).

Warsaw Ghetto 
The family, with the exception of Sabina who had married and left Poland, was forced into the Warsaw Ghetto and in May 1943 were deported to Majdanek where Ester and Hanka's parents were killed.

Auschwitz Uprising 
Ester and Hanka were transferred to Auschwitz-Birkenau in September 1943. Upon arrival, they were assigned to forced labor in the Weichsel-Union-Metalwerke (Union Munitions Plant) gunpowder room.

The sisters joined the resistance while working in the munitions plant. Ester, along with Hanka and fellow prisoners including Ala Gertner, Regina Safirsztajn, and Rose Grunapfel Meth smuggled gunpowder out of the factory and gave it to resistance fighter, Roza Robota. Roza, a prisoner who worked clothing-detail in Birkenau, then gave the gunpowder to the Sonderkommando, a group of death camp prisoners who were forced to dispose of the bodies of people murdered in the gas chamber in the crematoriums.

On October 7, 1944, the Sonderkommandos used the gunpowder to blow up Crematorium IV in Birkenau. Ala, Roza, Ester, and Regina were detained and tortured for their role in the plot. The women were publicly hanged in Birkenau on January 5, 1945. Hanka survived and was transferred to a sub-camp of Ravensbrück called Neustadt Glewe. The camp was liberated in May 1945 when Hanka was sixteen years old.

References

External links 
 Oral history interview with Anna (Hanka) Wajcblum Heilman, member of the resistance, revolt participant, and Holocaust survivor

Polish people who died in Auschwitz concentration camp
Polish people of World War II
Polish women in World War II resistance
People from Warsaw
1920s births
1945 deaths
Warsaw Ghetto inmates
Jewish resistance members during the Holocaust
Polish Jews who died in the Holocaust
People executed by Nazi Germany by hanging
Polish torture victims
Polish people executed in Nazi concentration camps
Jewish women